Anderson Marcelo da Silva (born 23 January 1981 in Kaloré, Paraná), commonly known as Marcelão, is a Brazilian footballer. He last played for Inter de Limeira.

Career
Marcelão played domestically with Mogi-Mirim, Londrina and Guarantinguetá (2000-2001). In April 2001 he left for FC Barcelona with Triguinho. This transfer was remarkable as Guarantinguetá is owned by "CSR Futebol e Marketing", an organization of former Brazilian international Rivaldo who played at FC Barcelona at the time. Marcelão was registered by FC Barcelona for the La Liga as a replacement for the long-term injured Abelardo Fernández, but the Brazilian ultimately did not play in the Spanish league. Marcelão did play two games in the Copa de Catalunya, on April 26, 2001 as a substitute against UDA Gramenet and on June 13, 2001 in the starting line-up in the final against CF Balaguer. In August 2001, he played against Derby County FC and Blackburn Rovers FC during a training camp in England. In both games, the defender was a substitute for Patrik Andersson: against Derby County he replaced the Swedish twenty minutes before the end and against Blackburn Rovers at half-time. In the season 2001/2002 Marcelão was sent on loan to Gimnàstic de Tarragona to play in the Segunda División.

Marcelão played for Oeste in 2004, and in 2005 for Marília. In 2007, while playing for Vila Nova, he was loaned to Brasiliense for the club's participation in that year's Copa do Brasil.

In 2007, he was transferred from Vila Nova to Boavista for the 2007-08 Portuguese season. Marcelão joined Greek club Asteras Tripolis in 2008.

References

External links

Marcelão at Liga Portugal (2007-08) 

1981 births
Living people
Brazilian footballers
Brazilian expatriate footballers
Oeste Futebol Clube players
Marília Atlético Clube players
Vila Nova Futebol Clube players
Brasiliense Futebol Clube players
Boavista F.C. players
Primeira Liga players
Super League Greece players
Association football central defenders
Sportspeople from Paraná (state)
Asteras Tripolis F.C. players
Expatriate footballers in Greece
Expatriate footballers in Portugal
Expatriate footballers in the United Arab Emirates